Stay is the 1986 album, released by the late 1970s and 1980s band The Controllers, which was released by MCA Records. It was produced by the band's member Barry J. Eastmond in collaboration with Galen Senogles and Ralph Benatar

The album subsequently went on the charts, peaking at number 25 on the Black Albums chart, making it the most successful R&B album of their career. This album also spanned two R&B singles, "Distant Lover" and their title track "Stay", which was a moderate hit in the UK.

Track listing
All songs written by Barry Eastmond, V.J. Smith, except where noted.

Chart positions

Singles

References

1986 albums
MCA Records albums
Contemporary R&B albums by American artists
Boogie albums